Targowisko may refer to the following places:
Targowisko, Greater Poland Voivodeship (west-central Poland)
Targowisko, Lesser Poland Voivodeship (south Poland)
Targowisko, Lublin Voivodeship (east Poland)